Tour of Adygeya is a women's staged cycle race which takes place in Russia. Between 2012 and 2015, the race was rated by the Union Cycliste Internationale (UCI) as a 2.2 race.

Winners

References

Cycle races in Russia
Women's road bicycle races
Sport in Adygea